Aglaophenia pluma, the toothed feather hydroid or podded hydroid, is a colonial hydroid in the family Aglaopheniidae and is found worldwide. It lives from the shore to 120m under water.

Description
Toothed feather hydroids are upright colonial hydroids with stems which may grow to 3 cm in total height though the colony may be larger. They have unbranched yellow stems and reproductive bodies that resemble pine-cones.

Ecology
This species has a sting which may cause swelling of the affected area in humans.

References

External links

 

Aglaopheniidae
Cnidarians of the Atlantic Ocean
Cnidarians of the Indian Ocean
Cnidarians of the Pacific Ocean
Cnidarians of the Caribbean Sea
Fauna of the Dominican Republic
Marine fauna of Africa
Marine fauna of Asia
Marine fauna of North America
Marine fauna of South America
Marine fauna of Southeast Asia
Animals described in 1758
Taxa named by Carl Linnaeus